The Ministry of Health and Social Protection is one of the sixteen national executive ministries of the Government of Colombia, and is responsible for coordinating and implementing the national policy and social services relating to health and social security.

History 
Upon assuming the Presidency of the Republic in his first term (2002-2006), President Álvaro Uribe Vélez decided to merge the Ministries of Health and Labor into the Ministry of Social Protection.

The two ministries that made up the Ministry of Social Protection were the Ministry of Labor, created by Law 96 of 1938, and the Ministry of Health, created under the name of Ministry of Hygiene by Law 27 of 1946 and later called the Ministry of Health. 

With the passage of Law 1444 of 2011, the Ministry of Social Protection was split into two; according to article 7 of said law, the Ministry of Social Protection was transformed into the Ministry of Labor, and according to article 9 of the same law, the Ministry of Health and Social Protection was created.

Location 
Previously, when the Ministry of Social Protection had not been separated, it was located at Carrera 13 No. 32-76 in the city of Bogotá . Currently the Ministry of Health is located at the same address, while the Ministry of Labor has its headquarters at Carrera 14 No. 99-33.

Ministers 
Below is a table of all past ministers, the time in which they served and the presidents who appointed them into office. Noted that the head of Ministry of Social Protection prior to 2011 is also listed:

References

Colombia, Health and Social Protection
Colombia, Health and Social Protection
Colombia, Health and Social Protection
2002 establishments in Colombia